Walter de Riddlesford (fl. 1150 – d. 1226) was an Anglo-Norman lord who was granted in Ireland the baronies of Bray, County Wicklow and Kilkea, County Kildare between 1171 and 1176.

De Riddlesford was born in Carriebenan, Kildare, Ireland. He married a daughter of Henry fitz Henry named Amabilis Fitzhenry.

He built a motte-and-bailey fortress on the site of what is now Kilkea Castle in County Kildare in 1181.

He died in 1226 and was succeeded by his son Walter. His granddaughter, Emmeline, married Hugh de Lacy, 1st Earl of Ulster (as his second wife) and, then, Stephen Longespée, son of William Longespée, 3rd Earl of Salisbury and grandson of Henry II of England (one of their daughters was Ela Longespee).

References

Year of birth unknown
1226 deaths
Normans in Ireland
Irish feudal barons